The 1997 UCLA Bruins football team represented the University of California, Los Angeles in the 1997 NCAA Division I-A football season.  They played their home games at the Rose Bowl in Pasadena, California and were coached by Bob Toledo. It was Toledo's second season as the UCLA head coach.  The Bruins finished 10–2 overall, and were Pacific-10 Conference co-champions with a 7–1 record.  The Bruins were invited to play in the Cotton Bowl Classic against Texas A&M on January 1, 1998.  Though the Bruins were down 16–7 at the half, Cade McNown, the offensive MVP of the game, led the team to a 29–23 victory.  The team was ranked #5 in the final AP Poll and #5 in the final Coaches' Poll.

Pre-season

Schedule

Roster

Game summaries

at Washington State

No. 3 Tennessee

*Source:  Box score

at Texas

Arizona

Houston

at Oregon

Oregon State

California

at Stanford

Washington

at USC

The Bruins retained the Victory Bell for the seventh straight year.

vs. Texas A&M Aggies (Cotton Bowl Classic)

Rankings

Awards and honors
Skip Hicks, Chad Overhauser, and Chris Sailer were selected to the 1997 College Football All-America Team.

1998 NFL Draft
The following players were selected in the 1998 NFL Draft.

References

UCLA
UCLA Bruins football seasons
Pac-12 Conference football champion seasons
Cotton Bowl Classic champion seasons
UCLA Bruins football